Soup are a post-rock band from Trondheim, Norway, founded in 2004 by the Norwegian-based multi-instrumentalist Erlend Viken as an outlet for his songwriting and compositional talents. Soup's music has been likened by some critics to that of Steven Wilson, Sigur Rós, Mogwai, and Explosions in the Sky, among others.

Discography

 Give It an Empire (2004)
 Come On Pioneers (2006)
 Children of E.L.B. (2010)
 Entropia (2012)
 The Beauty of Our Youth (2013)
 DUUN (2013)
 Remedies (2017)
 Live Cuts (2018)
 Visions (2021)

References

Norwegian post-rock groups
Norwegian progressive rock groups
Norwegian alternative rock groups